47 Capricorni is a variable star located around 1,170 light years from the Sun in the southern constellation Capricornus, near the northern border with Aquarius. It has the variable star designation of AG Capricorni and a Bayer designation of c2 Capricorni; 47 Capricorni is the Flamsteed designation. This object is visible to the naked eye as a dim, red-hued point of light with an apparent visual magnitude that varies between 5.90 and 6.14. The star is receding from the Earth with a heliocentric radial velocity of +20 km/s.

This is an aging red giant star with a stellar classification of M2III. It is a semiregular variable star of subtype SRb with a period of 30.592 days and a maximum brightness of 5.9 magnitude. With the supply of hydrogen at its core exhausted, the star has expanded to around 102 times the Sun's radius. It is radiating 1,940 times the luminosity of the Sun from its swollen photosphere at an effective temperature of 3,784 K.

References

M-type giants
Semiregular variable stars
Capricornus (constellation)
Capricorni, c2
BD-09 5833
Capricorni, 47
207005
107487
8318
Capricorni, AG